Tormarton is a village in South Gloucestershire, England. Its name may come from Thor Maer Tun meaning The settlement with the thorn (tree) on the boundary. Another source suggests the name derives from the church tower (Tor) on the border between Wessex and Mercia (Anglo-Saxon Meark). It is one mile North-East of junction 18 of the M4 motorway, with the A46 road and close to the border between Wiltshire and South Gloucestershire. In 2001 and 2011 there were 144 households and the population was 348. A National Trail, the Cotswold Way passes through the village. There is a church, a hotel, a pub and also a number of bed and breakfasts in the village. A Highways Agency depot with a salt dome is situated near to the village.

History

It is thought that humans have been active in the area of Tormarton for more than 6000 years. In 1968 the bodies of three Bronze Age men were discovered near Tormarton, when a gas pipeline was being installed. Unusually, two of the bodies showed combat wounds; they are now in Bristol City Museum. Further excavations were made in 1999 and 2000, which found remains of two other bodies estimated to be 3,500 years old. They are all thought to have all died at a similar time and were then buried in a ditch. A BBC documentary, Meet The Ancestors, was made that followed the second excavation.

The area is thought to have been inhabited by the Romans as a stone coffin was found in nearby Hinton. The village was on the border of the Anglo Saxon kingdoms of Wessex and Mercia. The medieval village was larger than today: extensive earthworks to the north and east of the church suggest that this area may have been settled previously. Some historic buildings remain in Tormarton; St Mary Magdalene Church, Manor Farm and Tormarton Court.

The Old Manor House, originally home of the St Loe family of Tormarton and Sutton Court at Chew Magna, was later owned by the de la Riviere family. Much of it was demolished in the English Civil War between 1642 and 1649, but some sections survived and were incorporated into today's Manor Farm. 

Tormarton Court is a Grade II listed Georgian house. The village became part of the Badminton estate, owned by the Duke of Beaufort, in 1789. In 1848 the population of the parish was 620.

Baron Altrincham, of Tormarton is a title in the Peerage of the United Kingdom that was created in 1945 for the politician Edward Grigg and then held by John Edward Poynder Grigg who disclaimed the title under the Peerage Act of 1963.

The M4 motorway to the west of Tormarton opened in 1967, with the section to the east running to Stanton St Quintin (Junction 17) opening four years later.

In 2008, SITA made a planning application to build a large in-vessel composting facility near Tormarton. Previously SITA had been proposing to site it on a brown field site in Pucklechurch but this was met with opposition from residents due to concerns it could pose a health risk and be an eyesore. The proposed facility would handle 30,000 tonnes of waste a year. BBC News reported that it was controversial with residents in Tormarton too.

Notable residents
James Dyson's estate, Dodington Park, is near Tormarton
John Mackay (1914–1999), headmaster of Bristol Grammar School, retired to Tormarton
Robert Payne (1596–1651), cleric and academic
Edward Grigg, 1st Baron Altrincham lived at Tormarton Court until his death in 1955
Sir William St Loe, Captain of the Guard to Queen Elizabeth I, Chief Butler of England and the third husband of Bess of Hardwick owned the manor of Tormarton
Sir Edward Wadham, Sheriff of Somerset and Dorset in 1502, married the widow of Sir John St Loe, father of William St Loe, and lived at the old manor of Tormarton in the early sixteenth century. He was Esquire of the Body in 1509 at the funeral of King Henry VII, and with his nephew Sir Nicholas Wadham represented the counties of Somerset and Gloucestershire at the Field of the Cloth of Gold with King Henry VIII in 1520. He was Sheriff of Gloucestershire in 1525, 1531, and 1541.

References

External links

Villages in South Gloucestershire District
Civil parishes in Gloucestershire